Elena Nobili (1833–1900) was an Italian painter, mainly of genre figure paintings.

She was born in Florence. Her son, Riccardo Nobili (1859–1939), was also a painter. Among her works are Reietti! (Exhibition of Turin, 1884); Bonaccia (Promotrice of Florence, 1884), Una visita; Aspettativa; Settembre; In campagna: Burrasche coniugali; Due novembre; Spariti!; Eccoli!; Musica; Prima del convegno; Contrasti; Figura del 700; smf La caccia sui tetti. At the Mostra Beatrice of "Female Works", held in 1890 in Florence, she won the silver medal.

References

1833 births
1900 deaths
Painters from Florence
19th-century Italian painters
Italian women painters
Italian genre painters
19th-century Italian women artists